Trail Crest is a mountain trail pass on the Mount Whitney Trail that crosses the Sierra Crest. East of the pass are 97 switchbacks leading down to Trail Camp in Inyo National Forest.

References 

Landforms of the Sierra Nevada (United States)
Mountain passes of California
Landforms of Inyo County, California